Peary is an unincorporated community in Saint Louis County, Minnesota, United States.

Geography
The community is located south of the city of Eveleth at the intersection of Saint Louis County Highway 16 (CR 16) and Peary Road. Peary is located on the survey point boundary line for Clinton Township, Fayal Township, and McDavitt Township.

State Highway 37 (MN 37) and U.S. Highway 53 are both nearby. The community of Forbes and the Saint Louis River are in the vicinity.

History
The community was named for Robert Peary (1856-1920), an American explorer.

References

 Official State of Minnesota Highway Map – 2011/2012 edition

Unincorporated communities in Minnesota
Unincorporated communities in St. Louis County, Minnesota